Silverpop was an Atlanta-based software company focused on digital marketing. It was acquired by IBM in 2014.

Overview 
Silverpop Systems was an email-marketing company cofounded as Avienda Technologies by Aaron Shapiro and David Bloom in 1999. Between 1999 and 2000, the company raised $35 million in funding from Draper Fisher Jurvetson and Gray Ventures and named Bill Nussey as CEO. In April 2013, the company raised another $25 million from Escalate Capital Partners and Silicon Valley Bank.

In March 2014, IBM confirmed that it would be acquiring SilverPop in a deal worth $275 million.

Platform 
Silverpop's cloud-based platform is said to provide marketers with the insights with respect to their customers and provides them with an automated system to send tailored messages to them.

References 

Software companies established in 1999
IBM acquisitions
IBM cloud services
1999 establishments in Georgia (U.S. state)